Risque (Gloria Dolores Muñoz) is a fictional character, a mutant appearing in American comic books published by Marvel Comics. Her first appearance was in X-Force #51 (August 1991).

Fictional character biography

Early life
Risque grew up in Florida to a Seminole mother and Cuban  father. As established in a textual flashback in X-Force #66, she used to spend much of her time at the Wacky World Amusement park with her father. After her powers manifested at thirteen, she abandoned her suddenly embarrassing dad and spent time at the park flirting with older boys. She even acquired a job there, but was fired after a fortnight for smoking in costume behind the Astro-World Tilt-A-Whirl. She then got into some trouble, which the mysterious Sledge helps extricate her from in return for doing him a favor.

Rendezvous with Warpath
Risque has to send a message to Warpath intimating that she has knowledge regarding the Camp Verde massacre. She meets Warpath in New York City, where she introduces herself to him from the shadows, plants a kiss on his lips, and leaves.

When Selene makes her move against the Externals, killing those who remain, Risque arrives and pulls the wounded Warpath out of Gideon's facility before Selene can drain his life. Risque takes James to Florida to recuperate and they fall for each other. Finally, James desires to get back to his friends, and the duo arrives just in time to defend X-Man from the genetic mastermind villain Mister Sinister. An ancient expert in mutancy, Sinister found Risque "fascinating" as "a mutant unknown".

Risque and Warpath's new romance was met with displeasure from Warpath's previous love interest and current teammate, Siryn. Warpath previously felt romantic feelings for Siryn but as Risque thinks, "Now she resents me for taking James away from her."

Warpath intends to remain at the X-Mansion, but the duo fights the Blob and Mimic in New York City. Risque finally fulfills her "mission" by slipping a sleeping pill into Jimmy's drink. She takes him to Sledge's junkyard in Detroit, Michigan. There, Sledge offers Warpath information concerning his tribe's murder in exchange for a favor of his own.

Fleeing X-Force

 Risque fled town knowing Warpath's teammates in X-Force would be on her trail. Paying by cash for her living arrangements to keep her untraceable, the X-Men's mutant-detecting machine Cerebro eventually tracks her down in the apartments surrounding Wacky World, the amusement park she knew by heart. Seeing X-Force in her motel room, Risque flees to Wacky World itself. Once again underestimating the lengths X-Force would go for her capture, she is blindsided by the mutant Caliban. She escapes from Caliban on the monorail and hides with two willing young male collaborators, who enjoy the intrigue Risque brings. Caliban finally catches up with her in a maintenance tunnel but he collapses. This was due to numerous biological tampering done to him over the years. Risque initially desires to flee before calling for 9-1-1, but her conscience forces her to stay behind and tend to the injured mutant. Her reluctance to leave when she had the chance caused her to be captured by the remaining members of X-Force, who initially believe she has harmed Caliban.

By the time X-Force arrives, a two and a half hour ride in their Pacrat, Warpath reveals that he was not held captive and was ready to leave, with Sledge's offer fresh on his mind.  Risque tries to make amends with Warpath but to no avail; pleading her case concerning her debt to Sledge does not work.  Unfortunately, her betrayal of Warpath's trust mars their relationship, as she had feared it would.  As their relationship seemed to be finished, a joyful Siryn smirks in the distance.

Reunion with X-Force
Months later, Risque ran into X-Force again while she was helping the Vanisher steal the Heart of Pele, a sacred Hawaiian gem. However, when she is attacked by one of the Lava Men, Warpath saves her and gets X-Force involved in the quest for the stone. They eventually return the stone to Pele, the Hawaiian goddess of the volcano. This prevents the Lava Men from using the Gem to activate ancient 'Deviant' machinery. Every volcano on Earth would have erupted if the Lava Men plan succeeded.

It turns out, though, that 'Risque' was in fact Pele herself and the real Risque, who had come to find the Heart, was still asleep on the beach. The team reunites with the real Gloria Muñoz and vacation on the island together.

Shortly after the incident in Hawaii, the psychic and physical connection between Danielle Moonstar and Arcadia spawns a new Demon Bear that rampaged through Sledge's warehouse. Risque is sent to help X-Force defeat the bear in San Francisco. Unfortunately, she is of very little help, and spends most of the time flirting with Warpath.

X-Corporation and "Death"
After the Xavier Institute became outed as a mutant organization, Risque was apparently contacted by Charles Xavier, who made her part of his X-Corporation monitoring mutant rights violations in Asia. Risque finds out about a company trafficking in mutant body parts. Unfortunately, she was ambushed by the U-Men, followers of John Sublime, founder of the Third Species movement. Risque did manage to compress one of her attackers into the size of a baseball, but could not fend them all off and was slain.  Her death scene was never seen on-panel nor was a body ever shown, but her seeming demise was supported by her former X-Force ally and X-Corporation teammate Domino.

Possible Reference
Risque was on She-Hulk's list of possible candidates to join the superhero group the Lady Liberators.  However, She-Hulk crossed the name off of her list, indicating that Risque was unavailable. If the reference was to Gloria Muñoz, this would presumably be due to her death (as described above). However, it may be that a different character was using the "Risque" name at that time.

Necrosha
Risque is among the dead mutants resurrected by the transmode virus that Selene sends to attack X-Force. She is one of the few mutants who regained control of her body and was able to warn Warpath to escape before succumbing to the virus and resuming her assault. Gloria's final fate is uncertain as it is unknown whether she was among the mutants teleported to Genosha by Blink to serve as sacrifices for the newly deified Selene or if she was among the mutants who managed to escape Utopia.

Powers and abilities
Risque is a mutant with the ability to create localized gravity fields, which affects inorganic matter within an object, and compress it into a small, high-density mass. She can telekinetically maneuver that object to propel it at high velocities, as well as projecting concussive blasts of pink psychokinetic energy. Although, not at superhuman levels, she is naturally skilled in acrobatics.

References

External links
 Risque at Marvel.com

Characters created by Jeph Loeb
Comics characters introduced in 1996
Fictional mercenaries in comics
Fictional characters with gravity abilities
Marvel Comics female superheroes
Marvel Comics mutants
Fictional characters from Florida
Cuban superheroes